In materials science, MXenes are a class of two-dimensional inorganic compounds , that consist of atomically thin layers of transition metal carbides, nitrides, or carbonitrides. MXenes accept a variety of hydrophilic terminations. MXenes were reported for the first time in 2012, and their studies have been undergoing an exponential growth as shown in the figure on the right. Since 2020 the number of patent familiies about MXenes has exceeded the number of journal articles about MXenes, which is indicative of them potentially being commercially successful materials.

Structure 

As-synthesized MXenes prepared via HF etching have an accordion-like morphology, which can be referred to as multi-layer MXene (ML-MXene), or few-layer MXene (FL-MXene) given fewer than five layers. Because the surfaces of MXenes can be terminated by functional groups, the naming convention Mn+1XnTx can be used, where T is a functional group (e.g. O, F, OH, Cl).

Mono transition 
MXenes adopt three structures with one metal on the M site, as inherited from the parent MAX phases: M2C, M3C2, and M4C3. They are produced by selectively etching out the A element from a MAX phase or other layered precursor (e.g., Mo2Ga2C), which has the general formula Mn+1AXn, where M is an early transition metal, A is an element from group 13 or 14 of the periodic table, X is C and/or N, and n = 1–4. MAX phases have a layered hexagonal structure with P63/mmc symmetry, where M layers are nearly closed packed and X atoms fill octahedral sites. Therefore, Mn+1Xn layers are interleaved with the A element, which is metallically bonded to the M element.

Double transition 

Double transition metal MXenes can take two forms, ordered double transition metal MXenes or solid solution MXenes. For ordered double transition metal MXenes, they have the general formulas:  M’2M”C2 or M’2M”2C3 where M’ and M” are different transition metals. Double transition metal carbides that have been synthesized include Mo2TiC2, Mo2Ti2C3, Cr2TiC2, and Mo4VC4. In some of these MXenes (such as Mo2TiC2, Mo2Ti2C3, and Cr2TiC2), the Mo or Cr atoms are on outer edges of the MXene and these atoms control electrochemical properties of the MXenes.

For solid-solution MXenes, they have the general formulas: (M’2−yM”y)C, (M’3−yM”y)C2, (M’4−yM”y)C3, or (M’5−yM”y)C4, where the metals are randomly distributed throughout the structure in solid solutions leading to continuously tailorable properties.

Divacancy 
By designing a parent 3D atomic laminate, (Mo2/3Sc1/3)2AlC, with in-plane chemical ordering, and by selectively etching the Al and Sc atoms, there is evidence for 2D Mo1.33C sheets with ordered metal divacancies.

Synthesis

MXenes are typically synthesized by a top-down selective etching process. This synthetic route has been shown to be scalable, with no loss or change in properties as the batch size is increased. Producing a MXene by etching a MAX phase occurs mainly by using strong etching solutions that contain a fluoride ion (F−) such as hydrofluoric acid (HF), ammonium bifluoride (NH4HF2), and a mixture of hydrochloric acid (HCl) and lithium fluoride (LiF). For example, etching of Ti3AlC2 in aqueous HF at room temperature causes the A (Al) atoms to be selectively removed, and the surface of the carbide layers becomes terminated by O, OH, and/or F atoms. MXene can also be obtained in Lewis acid molten salts, such as ZnCl2, and Cl terminal can be realized. The Cl-terminated MXene is structurally stable up to 750 °C. A general Lewis acid molten salt approach was proven viable to etch most of MAX phases members (such as MAX-phase precursors with A elements Si, Zn and Ga) by some other melts (CdCl2, FeCl2, CoCl2, CuCl2, AgCl, NiCl2).

The MXene Ti4N3 was the first nitride MXene reported, and is prepared by a different procedure than those used for carbide MXenes. To synthesize Ti4N3, the MAX phase Ti4AlN3 is mixed with a molten eutectic fluoride salt mixture of lithium fluoride, sodium fluoride, and potassium fluoride and treated at elevated temperatures. This procedure etches out Al, yielding multilayered Ti4N3, which can further be delaminated into single and few layers by immersing the MXene in tetrabutylammonium hydroxide, followed by sonication.

Types 

2-1 MXenes: Ti2C, V2C, Nb2C, Mo2C 
Mo2N, Ti2N, (Ti2−yNby)C, (V2−yNby)C, (Ti2−yVy)C, W1.33C, Nb1.33C, Mo1.33C, Mo1.33Y0.67C 

3-2 MXenes: Ti3C2 , Ti3CN, Zr3C2 and Hf3C2

4-3 MXenes: Ti4N3, Nb4C3 , Ta4C3 , V4C3, (Mo,V)4C3

5-4 MXenes: Mo4VC4 

Double transition metal MXenes:

2-1-2 MXenes: Mo2TiC2, Cr2TiC2, Mo2ScC2 

2-2-3 MXenes: Mo2Ti2C3

Covalent surface modification 
2D transition-metal carbides surfaces can be chemically transformed with a variety of functional groups such as O, NH, S, Cl, Se, Br, and Te surface terminations as well as bare MXenes. The strategy involves installation and removal of the surface groups by performing substitution and elimination reactions in molten inorganic salts. Covalent bonding of   organic molecules to MXene surfaces has been demonstrated through reaction with aryl diazonium salts.

Intercalation and delamination
Since MXenes are layered solids and the bonding between the layers is weak, intercalation of the guest molecules in MXenes is possible. Guest molecules include dimethyl sulfoxide (DMSO), hydrazine, and urea. For example, N2H4 (hydrazine) can be intercalated into Ti3C2(OH)2 with the molecules parallel to the MXene basal planes to form a monolayer. Intercalaction increases the MXene c lattice parameter (crystal structure parameter that is directly proportional to the distance between individual MXene layers), which weakens the bonding between MX layers. Ions, including Li+, Pb2+, and Al3+, can also be intercalated into MXenes, either spontaneously or when a negative potential is applied to a MXene electrode.

Delamination 
Ti3C2 MXene produced by HF etching has accordion-like morphology with residual forces that keep MXene layers together preventing separation into individual layers. Although those forces are quite weak, ultrasound treatment results only in very low yields of single-layer flakes. For large scale delamination, DMSO is intercalated into ML-MXene powders under constant stirring to further weaken the interlayer bonding and then delaminated with ultrasound treatment. This results in large scale layer separation and formation of the colloidal solutions of the FL-MXene. These solutions can later be filtered to prepare MXene "paper" (similar to Graphene oxide paper).

MXene clay
For the case of Ti3C2Tx and Ti2CTx, etching with concentrated hydrofluoric acid leads to open, accordion-like morphology with a compact distance between layers (this is common for other MXene compositions as well). To be dispersed in suspension, the material must be pre-intercalated with something like dimethylsulfoxide. However, when etching is conducted with hydrochloric acid and LiF as a fluoride source, morphology is more compact with a larger inter-layer spacing, presumably due to amounts of intercalated water. The material has been found to be ‘clay-like’: as seen in clay materials (e.g. smectite clays and kaolinite), Ti3C2Tx demonstrates the ability to expand its interlayer distance hydration and can reversibly exchange charge-balancing Group I and Group II cations. Further, when hydrated, the MXene clay becomes pliable and can be molded into desired shapes, becoming a hard solid upon drying. Unlike most clays, however, MXene clay shows high electrical conductivity upon drying and is hydrophilic, and disperses into single layer two-dimensional sheets in water without surfactants. Further, due to these properties, it can be rolled into free-standing, additive-free electrodes for energy storage applications.

Material processing 
MXenes can be  solution processed in aqueous or polar organic solvents, such as water, ethanol, dimethyl formamide, propylene carbonate, etc., enabling various types of deposition via vacuum filtration, spin coating, spray coating, dip coating, and roll casting. There have been studies conducted on ink-jet printing of additive free Ti3C2Tx inks and inks composed of Ti3C2Tx and proteins.

Lateral flake size often plays a role in the observed properties and there are several synthetic routes that produce varying degrees of flake size. For example, when HF is used as an etchant, the intercalation and delamination step will require sonication to exfoliate material into single flakes, resulting in flakes that are several hundreds of nanometers in lateral size. This is beneficial for applications such as catalysis and select biomedical and electrochemical applications. However, if larger flakes are warranted, especially for electronic or optical applications, defect-free and large area flakes are necessary. This can be achieved by Minimally Intensive Layer Delamination (MILD) method, where the quantity of LiF to MAX phase is scaled up resulting in flakes that can be delminated in situ when washing to neutral pH.

Post-synthesis processing techniques to tailor the flake size have also been investigated, such as sonication, differential centrifugation, and density gradient centrifugation procedures. Post processing methods rely heavily on the as-produced flake size. Using sonication allows for a decrease in flake size from 4.4 μm (as-produced), to an average of 1.0 μm after 15 minutes of bath sonication (100 W, 40 kHz), down to 350 nm after 3 hours of bath sonication. By utilizing probe sonication (8 s ON, 2 s OFF pulse, 250 W), flakes were reduced to an average of 130 nm in lateral size. Differential centrifugation, also known as cascading centrifugation, can be used to select flakes based on lateral size by increasing the centrifuge speed sequentially from low speeds (e.g. 1000 rpm) to high speeds (e.g., 10000 rpm) and collecting the sediment. When this was performed, "large" (800 nm), "medium" (300 nm) and "small" (110 nm) flakes can be obtained. Density gradient centrifugation is also another method for selecting flakes based on lateral size, where a density gradient is employed in the centrifuge tube and flakes move through the centrifuge tube at different rates based on the flake density relative to the medium. In the case of sorting MXenes, a sucrose and water density gradient can be used from 10 to 66 w/v %. Using density gradients allows for more mono-disperse distributions in flake sizes and studies show the flake distribution can be varied from 100 to 10 μm without employing sonication.

Properties
With a high electron density at the Fermi level, MXene monolayers are predicted to be metallic. In MAX phases, N(EF) is mostly M 3d orbitals, and the valence states below EF are composed of two sub-bands. One, sub-band A, made of hybridized Ti 3d-Al 3p orbitals, is near EF, and another, sub-band B, −10 to −3 eV below EF which is due to hybridized Ti 3d-C 2p and Ti 3d-Al 3s orbitals. Said differently, sub-band A is the source of Ti-Al bonds, while sub-band B is the source of Ti-C bond. Removing A layers causes the Ti 3d states to be redistributed from missing Ti-Al bonds to delocalized Ti-Ti metallic bond states near the Fermi energy in Ti2, therefore N(EF) is 2.5–4.5 times higher for MXenes than MAX phases. Experimentally, the predicted higher N(EF) for MXenes has not been shown to lead to higher resistivities than the corresponding MAX phases. The energy positions of the O 2p (∼6 eV) and the F 2p (∼9 eV) bands from the Fermi level of Ti2CTx and Ti3C2Tx both depend on the adsorption sites and the bond lengths to the termination species.
Significant changes in the Ti-O/F coordination are observed with increasing temperature in the heat treatment.

Only MXenes without surface terminations are predicted to be magnetic. Cr2C, Cr2N, and Ta3C2 are predicted to be ferromagnetic; Ti3C2 and Ti3N2 are predicted to be anti-ferromagnetic. None of these magnetic properties have yet been demonstrated experimentally.

Optical 
Membranes of MXenes, such as Ti3C2 and Ti2C, have dark colors, indicating their strong light absorption in the visible wavelengths. MXenes are promising photo-thermal materials due to their strong visible light absorption. More interestingly, it is reported that the optical properties of MXenes such as Ti3C2 and Ti2C in the IR region quite differ from that in the visible wavelengths. For the wavelengths above 1.4 micrometer, these materials show negative permittivity, resulting in a strong metallic response to the IR light. In other words, they are highly reflective to IR lights. From the Kirchhoff's law of radiation, a low IR absorption means a low IR emissivity. The two MXenes materials show IR emissivity as low as 0.1, which are similar to some metals. Such magic materials that are visible black but IR white are highly desired in many areas, such as camouflage, thermal management, and information encryption.

Corrosion resistance 
There is a growing body of the literature that recognises MXenes as high-performance corrosion inhibitors. The corrosion resistance of Ti3C2Tx MXene can be attributed to the synergy of good dispersibility, barrier effect and corrosion inhibitor release.

Biological properties
Compared to graphene oxide, which has been widely reported as an antibacterial agent, Ti2C MXene shows lack of antibacterial properties. On the other hand, MXene of Ti3C2 MXene shows a higher antibacterial efficiency toward both Gram-negative E. coli and Gram-positive B. subtilis. Colony forming unit and regrowth curves showed that more than 98% of both bacterial cells lost viability at 200 μg/mL Ti3C2 colloidal solution within 4 h of exposure. Damage to the cell membrane was observed, which resulted in release of cytoplasmic materials from the bacterial cells and cell death. The principal in vitro studies of cytotoxicity of 2D sheets of MXenes showed promise for applications in bioscience and biotechnology. Presented studies of anticancer activity of the Ti3C2 MXene was determined on two normal (MRC-5 and HaCaT) and two cancerous (A549 and A375) cell lines. The cytotoxicity results indicated that the observed toxic effects were higher against cancerous cells compared to normal ones. The mechanisms of potential toxicity were also elucidated. It was shown that Ti3C2 MXene may affect the occurrence of oxidative stress and, in consequence, the generation of reactive oxygen species (ROS). Further studies on Ti3C2 MXene revealed potential of MXenes as a novel ceramic photothermal agent used for cancer therapy. In neuronal biocompatibility studies, neurons cultured on Ti3C2 are as viable as those in control cultures, and they can adhere, grow axonal processes, and form functional networks.

Water purification 
One-micron-thick Ti3C2 MXene membranes demonstrated ultrafast water flux (approximately 38 L/(Bar·h·m2)) and differential sieving of salts depending on both the hydration radius and charge of the ions. Cations larger than the interlayer spacing of MXene do not permeate through Ti3C2 membranes. As for smaller cations, the ones with a larger charge permeate an order of magnitude slower than single-charged cations.

Potential applications 
MXenes, as conductive layered materials with tunable surface terminations, have been shown to be promising for energy storage applications (Li-ion batteries, supercapacitors, and energy storage components), composites, photocatalysis, water purification, gas sensors, transparent conducting electrodes, neural electrodes, as a metamaterial, SERS substrate, photonic diode, electrochromic device, and triboelectric nanogenerator (TENGs), to name a few.

Lithium-ion batteries 
MXenes have been investigated experimentally in lithium-ion batteries (LIBs) (e.g. V2CTx , Nb2CTx , Ti2CTx , and Ti3C2Tx). V2CTx has demonstrated the highest reversible charge storage capacity among MXenes in multi-layer form (280 mAhg−1 at 1C rate and 125 mAhg−1 at 10C rate). Multi-layer Nb2CTx showed a stable, reversible capacity of 170 mAhg−1 at 1C rate and 110 mAhg−1 at a 10C rate. Although Ti3C2Tx shows the lowest capacity among the four MXenes in multi-layer form, it can be delaminated via sonication of the multi-layer powder. By virtue of higher electrochemically active and accessible surface area, delaminated Ti3C2Tx paper demonstrates a reversible capacity of 410 mAhg−1 at 1C and 110 mAhg−1 at 36C rate. As a general trend, M2X MXenes can be expected to have greater capacity than their M3X2 or M4X3 counterparts at the same applied current, since M2X MXenes have the fewest atomic layers per sheet.

In addition to high power capabilities, each MXene has a different active voltage window, which could allow their use as battery cathodes/anodes. Moreover, the experimentally measured capacity for Ti3C2Tx paper is higher than predicted from computer simulations, indicating that further investigation is required to ascertain the charge storage mechanism.

Sodium-ion batteries
MXenes exhibit promising performances for sodium-ion batteries. Na+ should diffuse rapidly on MXene surfaces, which is favorable for fast charging/discharging. Two layers of Na+ can be intercalated in between MXene layers. As a typical example, multilayered Ti2CTx MXene as a negative electrode material showed a capacity of 175 mA h g−1 and good rate capability. It is possible to tune the Na-ion insertion potentials of MXenes by changing the transition metal and surface functional groups. V2CTx MXene has been successfully applied as a cathode material. Porous MXene-based paper electrodes have been reported to exhibit high volumetric capacities and stable cycling performance, demonstrating promise for devices where size matters.

Supercapacitors 
MXenes are under study to improve supercapacitor energy density. Improvements come from increased charge storage density, which can be increased in several ways. Increasing the available surface area for potential redox reactions through increasing interlayer spacing can accommodate more ions, but reduces electrode density. The synthesis route controls the surface chemistry and plays a large role in determining the intercalation reaction rate and the charge storage density. For example, molten salt prepared Ti3C2Tx MXenes, with chlorine surface groups, show a capacity of 142 mAh g−1 at 13C rate and 75 mAh g−1 at 128C rate, driven by full desolvation of Li+, allowing for increased charge storage density in the electrode. In comparison, Ti3C2Tx MXenes prepared through HF etching show a capacity of 107.2 mAh g−1 at 1C rate.

Composite Ti3C2Tx-based electrodes, including Ti3C2Tx/polymer (e.g. PPy, Polyaniline), Ti3C2Tx /TiO2, and Ti3C2Tx/Fe2O3 have been explored. Notably, Ti3C2Tx hydrogel electrodes delivered a high volumetric capacitance of up to 1500 F/cm3.

Supercapacitor electrodes based on Ti3C2Tx MXene paper in aqueous solutions demonstrate excellent cyclability and the ability to store 300-400 F/cm3, which translates to three times as much energy as for activated carbon and graphene-based capacitors. Ti3C2 MXene clay showed a volumetric capacitance of 900 F/cm3, a higher capacitance per unit of volume than most other materials, without losing any of its capacitance through more than 10,000 charge/discharge cycles.

In Ti3C2Tx MXene electrodes for lithium-ion electrolytes, the choice of solvent greatly affected the ion transport and intercalation kinetics. In a propylene carbonate (PC) solvent, efficient desolvation of lithium ions during intercalation led to increased volumetric charge storage, with negligible increase in electrode volume. The improved kinetics garnered through solvent choice led to improved charge storage density when comparing the PC system to acetonitrile or dimethyl sulfoxide by a factor greater than 2.

Composites 
FL-Ti3C2 (the most studied MXene) nanosheets can mix intimately with polymers such as polyvinyl alcohol (PVA), forming alternating MXene-PVA layered structures. The electrical conductivities of the composites can be controlled from 4×10−4 to 220 S/cm (MXene weight content from 40% to 90%). The composites have tensile strength up to 400% stronger than pure MXene films and show better capacitance up to 500 F/cm3.  By using electrostatic self-assembly, flexible and conductive MXene/graphene supercapacitor electrodes are produced. The free-standing MXene/graphene electrode displays a volumetric capacitance
of 1040 F/cm3, an impressive rate capability with 61% capacitance retention and in long cycle life.
A method of alternative filtration for forming MXene-carbon nanomaterials composite films is also devised. These composites show better rate performance at high scan rates in supercapacitors. The insertion of polymers or carbon nanomaterials between MXene layers enables electrolyte ions to diffuse more easily through the MXenes, which is the key for their applications in flexible energy storage devices. The mechanical properties of epoxy/MXenes is comparable with graphene and CNTs, the tensile strength and modulus can increase up to 67% and 23% respectively.

Biosensors and biofuel cells 
MXenes are opening a new avenue for the development of amperometric enzymatic biosensors, because direct charge transfer between MXenes and heme-based redox proteins (hemoglobin) has already been reported. This finding opens a new avenue for designing MXene-based biosensors and biofuel cells with various redox enzymes capable of direct charge transfer.

Porous materials 
Porous MXenes (Ti3C2, Nb2C and V2C) have been produced via a facile chemical etching method at room temperature. Porous Ti3C2 has a larger specific surface area and more open structure, and can be filtered as flexible films with, or without, the addition of carbon nanotubes (CNTs). The as-fabricated p-Ti3C2/CNT films showed significantly improved lithium ion storage capabilities, with a capacity as high as 1250 mA·h·g−1 at 0.1 C, excellent cycling stability, and good rate performance.

Antennas 
Scientists at Drexel University in the US have created spray on antennas that perform as well as current antennas found in phones, routers and other gadgets by painting MXene's onto everyday objects, widening the scope of the Internet of things considerably.

Optoelectronic devices 
MXene SERS substrates have been manufactured by spray-coating and were used to detect several common dyes, with calculated enhancement factors reaching ~106. Titanium carbide MXene demonstrates SERS effect in aqueous colloidal solutions, suggesting the potential for biomedical or environmental applications, where MXene can selectively enhance positively charged molecules. Transparent conducting electrodes have been fabricated with titanium carbide MXene showing the ability to transmit approximately 97% of visible light per nanometer thickness. The performance of MXene transparent conducting electrodes depends on the MXene composition as well as synthesis and processing parameters.

Superconductivity 
Nb2C MXenes exhibit surface-group-dependent superconductivity.

References 

Materials science
Electrochemistry
Physical chemistry
Inorganic carbon compounds